Graham Reilly is a British composer, known for composing television music in the UK, Europe and US.

Based in his HQ Studio, Reilly has scored the music to over 700 hours of prime time TV and Film productions in the US, UK and Europe, for all the major networks including: BBC, ITV, Channel 4, Channel 5 National Geographic Channel, Discovery Channel, SKY UK.

Reilly was mentored by the late Peter Waygood ex-head of Production, Air Edel Associates Ltd (London/USA). Senior Lecturer at The Royal Academy of Music (London), and Chairman of PCAM (Producers & Composers of Applied Music).

One of the most known TV series, Reilly has composed the music for is the awarding winning series on National Geographic Channel - TV series Seconds From Disaster which has been shown in over 140 territories worldwide on the National Geographic network of channels.

Reel History of Britain presented by broadcaster Lord Melvyn Bragg - performed by the BBC Philharmonic and recorded at BBC Studios Manchester.

The Story of Britain - BBC animation series nominated for a BAFTA.

Heaven Made - BBC one - wins Royal Television Society (RTS) award for Best Daytime Programme.

Dragons' Den - BAFTA nominated TV series - BBC one/TWO.

Columbia’s Last Flight - Seconds From Disaster – National Geographic Channel - New York Festivals TV Awards Gold Winner.

Bali Bombing - Seconds From Disaster – National Geographic Channel - Emmy Nomination.

Mastermind - BBC TWO/SBS TV - new arrangements for the iconic quiz show - one of the longest running shows on the BBC.

Chinese School - BBC series - nomination - Best of the Year Documentary and shortlisted Best Documentary series Broadcast Awards.

Home Is Where The Art Is - BBC one - Royal Television Society (RTS) nomination for Best BBC Daytime TV series.

Villages by the Sea - BBC one - Royal Television Society (RTS) nomination for Best Factual TV series.

A Lake District Farm Shop - Channel 4 - Royal Television Society (RTS) nomination for Best Factual Entertainment series.

A Lake District Farm Shop - Channel 4 - Royal Television Society (RTS) nomination for Best Regional Programme.

Music Credits for TV 
 Motorway Cops: Total Carnage - series 1 - Channel 5
 Britain's Most Beautiful Road - new series - Channel 4
 Motorway Cops: Catching Britain's Speeders - series 3 - Channel 5
 A Cotswold Farm Shop - new series - Channel 4
 A Lake District Farm Shop - series 2 - Channel 4 - RTS nomination for Best Factual Entertainment / Best Regional Programme.
 Villages by the Sea - series 3 - BBC One/TWO - RTS nomination for Best Factual series.
 A Lake District Farm Shop at Christmas - Channel 4 
 Home Is Where the Art Is - series 2 - BBC One 
 Home Is Where the Art Is - series 1 - BBC One - RTS nomination for Best BBC Daytime TV series. 
 A Lake District Farm Shop - series 1 - Channel 4
Villages By The Sea - series 2 - BBC One/TWO
 Antiques Hunters on Tour - Channel 4
 Motorway Cops: Catching Britain's Speeders - series 2 - Channel 5
 Mastermind/Celebrity Mastermind - BBC TWO/SBS TV
 Christmas City - BBC One
 Dragons' Den - BBC One/TWO
 Motorway Cops: Catching Britain's Speeders - series 1 - Channel 5
 Call the Council - series 3 - BBC One
 Seconds From Disaster - season 7 - National Geographic Channel
 Tomoko - Japanese Short - Finite Films and TV
 Technobabble - series 2 - CBBC
 Demolition: The Wrecking Crew - BBC TWO
 Call the Council - series 2 - BBC One
 Technobabble - series 1 - CBBC
 The Story of Britain - BBC - BAFTA nomination.
 Call the Council - series 1 - BBC One
 Permission Impossible: Britain's Planners - BBC TWO
 Oilfield Iraq - LUK Oil - If Not Us Films
 Thelma's Gypsy Girls / Little Shop of Gypsies - Channel 4 / TLC
 The Planners - BBC TWO
 Seconds From Disaster - season 6 - National Geographic Channel
 Children of 9/11: Revealed - Channel 5
 Seconds From Disaster - season 5 - National Geographic Channel - episode: Bali Bombing - Emmy Nomination.
 Reel History of Britain - BBC TWO - performed by the BBC Philharmonic and recorded at BBC Studios Manchester.
 Ben Fogle Escape in Time - BBC TWO
 Sea Patrol UK - Channel 5 / National Geographic Channel
 Sailing The Treasure Ship - National Geographic Channel
 Arab Treasure Ship (Ancient Megastructures) - National Geographic Channel
 The Trigger - Wellington Films
 Coastline Cops - ITV / ITV4
 Dangerous Adventures For Boys - Channel 5
 Alaska Oilmen - Gamble On The Ice - Discovery Channel
 Chinese School - BBC TWO / BBC Four / BBC Worldwide - nomination for Best Documentary - Broadcast Awards.
 El Hoppo! - Dan Films - Festival Finalist Nominated for best short film at this year's Rushes Soho Shorts Film Festival 2008.
 Britain's Best - UKTV
 The Dearly Departed - Living Stone Film
 Big Ideas That Changed The World - Channel  5 -series 2
 Oil, Sweat & Rigs - Discovery Channel
 Seconds From Disaster - National Geographic Channel - episode: Columbia's Last Flight won Gold World Medal 2006 New York Festivals.
Big Ideas That Changed The World - Channel 5 - series 1
Scrapheap Challenge - The Scrappy Races - Channel 4 - series 3
 The Sofa - Working Title Films
 Leave No Trace - BBC One
Scrapheap Challenge - The Scrappy Races - Channel 4 - series 2
Pieter en de Vogels - Vroum Vroum
 Rebuilding Stonehenge - National Geographic Channel
 Test Case - Discovery Channel
 Stonehenge The Ultimate Experiment Live! - Channel 5
 Scrapheap Challenge - The Scrappy Races - Channel 4 - series 1
 The Real CSI - Channel 5
 Las Vegas CSU (Crime Scene Unit) - Court TV

Production Music - used on TV Series 
 Villages by the Sea - BBC One/BBC TWO
 Heaven Made - BBC One/BBC TWO - RTS nomination for Best Daytime Programme.
 Heaven Made at Christmas - BBC One/BBC TWO 
 Britain's Dangerous Drivers - Channel 5
 Traffic Cops - BBC One
 Pitches to Riches - BBC TWO
 Harry Hills - TV Burp - BBC Four
 Motorway Cops - BBC One
 Best Ever Pitches - BBC TWO
 Secrets of Althorp The Spencers Club - PBS
 The Wonderful World Of Crafting - Channel 5
 Rip Off Britain - BBC One
 Shop, Robbers and Videotape - Channel 5
 Oil Strike! / Wildcatters - Discovery Channel
 Dispatches - Channel 4
 The Harlot’s Progress - Channel 4
 30 Minutes - Channel 4
 Madonna and Mercy - Channel 4
 Car Crime UK - ITV
  Sewer Men - ITV
 Car Wars - BBC One
 Make Me A Baby - BBC Three
 Watersports World - Sky Sports / Fox
 Race World - Sky Sports / Fox
 Sports Unlimited - Sky Sports / Fox
 Chef Academy - Bravo (US TV channel)
 Birth of Britain - Channel 4
 Wheelers Dealers - Discovery Channel
 Trains with Peter Waterman - Channel 4
 Mayday Mayday - ITV
 Is Our Weather Getting Worse? - Channel 4
 Disasters at Sea: Why Ships Sink - Channel 4
 Death Scene Investigations - Five/MSNBC
 Technobytes - CBBC
 Celebs On The Farm - 5 Star
 Celebrity Big Brother - Channel 5 & MTV
 Bargin Shop Wars - ITV
 Make You Laugh Out Loud - Channel 5
 Weather That Changed The World - Viasat History
 Motorsport 2017 - Sky Sports
 Criminally Funny Caught In The Act - Channel 5

References

External links 
 Graham Reilly official website
 
 Graham Reilly- incredible music

Living people
British composers
Place of birth missing (living people)
Year of birth missing (living people)